The first chess youth championship in Europe was the yearly European Junior Championship for under age 20. It was played from 1971–2002. FIDE officially introduced the European Junior Championship in 1970 at their Annual Congress and so the 1971/72 edition was the first official European Junior Championship. Effectively, they adopted the 'Niemeyer Tournament', held every year in Groningen since 1962, and re-packaged it. For completeness also the winners of this Niemeyer tournament are listed. The first competition for girls was held in 1977/1978.

List of winners

Notes
The main source of reference is indicated beneath each year's entry.

1962/63 - Groningen, Netherlands - (January 1963) - One of the earliest junior international tournaments held at Groningen under the sponsorship of tobacco firm T. Niemeyer. The event was later informally recognised as the European Junior Championship and later still, adopted by FIDE as the official contest. In this edition, there was a strong showing from the Benelux countries, but England's Keith Richardson (7 points), a student at Durham University, managed to take a good second place, after the Netherlands' Coenraad Zuidema (7½). There followed three players on 5½; E. C. Scholl, E. W. R. Abbing (both Netherlands) and P. Ostermeyer (West Germany).

Boys U-20 - 1. Coenraad Zuidema (NED) 2. Keith Richardson (ENG) 3. Eddy Scholl (NED)

 --- CHESS magazine No. 430, Vol. 28 p. 193

1976/77 - Groningen, Netherlands - (December 21, 1976 - January 5, 1977) - The event was shared with the contest to determine the World Junior Champion, that particular title going to the top placed player overall, namely Mark Diesen (see World Junior Chess Championship). Ľubomír Ftáčnik finished top European player and therefore took the title European Junior Champion. Tied for 4th-8th places were Daniel Campora from Argentina, Leslie Leow from Singapore, Marcel Sisniega from Mexico and Evgeny Vladimirov from the USSR. Also in the chasing pack - Ian Rogers (AUS), Krum Georgiev (BUL), Attila Grószpéter (HUN), Jonathan Mestel (ENG), Petar Popović (YUG), Reynaldo Vera (CUB), Murray Chandler (NZL) and Margeir Petursson (ISL). Jonathan Speelman (ENG) played one game and was then disqualified, following protests from other countries that England had more than one representative. Of course, his entry had been previously ratified by FIDE.

Boys U-20 - 1. Mark Diesen (USA) 2. Ľubomír Ftáčnik (CZE) 3. Nir Grinberg (ISR)

 --- British Chess Magazine No. 5, Vol. 97 p. 222

1977/78 - Groningen, Netherlands - (December 20, 1977 - January 5, 1978) - Taulbut of England won the event on tie-break and the result was also good enough to earn him the IM title. In close contention for a place in the first three were, 4th O. Foisor (ROM) and sharing 5th-8th places, A. Grószpéter (HUN), D. Goodman (ENG), K. Mokry (CZE) and T. Upton (SCO).

Boys U-20 - 1. Shaun Taulbut (ENG) 2. Sergey Dolmatov (USSR) 3. Krum Georgiev (BUL)

 --- British Chess Magazine No. 3, Vol. 98 p. 114

1978/79 - Kikinda, Yugoslavia - (January 21 - February 1, 1978) - Among the competitors were last year's champion Bozena Sikora of Poland, the promising 15-year-old Soviet Nana Ioseliani, and the Yugoslav Junior Champion, Dusica Cejic. 14-year-old Swede Pia Cramling beat the second placed Klimova, but was too erratic to join the leading group.

Girls U-20 - 1. Nana Ioseliani (USSR) 2. Eliska Klimova (CZE) 3. Viorica Ilie (ROM)

 --- British Chess Magazine No. 3, Vol. 98 pp. 117-118

1978/79 - Groningen, Netherlands - (December 21, 1978 - January 5, 1979) - Sponsored by the Gasunie Company for the fourth successive year. The players found the organisation and playing conditions to their liking. World Junior Champion, Sergey Dolmatov was tipped to win, but was edged into second by home favourite John van der Wiel, a 19-year-old law student. Third placed James Plaskett (ENG) looked like he might catch the leading pair, but lost to Margeir Petursson (ISL) in round 11.

Boys U-20 - 1. John van der Wiel (NED) 2. Sergey Dolmatov (USSR) 3. James Plaskett (ENG)

 --- British Chess Magazine No. 2, Vol. 99 pp. 72 - 75

1986/87 - Groningen, Netherlands - (December 1986 - January 1987) - The winner Ivanchuk began with 5 straight wins, and gave early notice of his natural talent. In the last round, he drew with Blatny (CZE) and this allowed home nation representative Piket (NED) to leapfrog into second place by beating Ninov (BUL). Ivan Sokolov (BIH) took a share of 3rd-5th places. There was a lower than normal entry of 30.

Boys U-20 - 1. Vasily Ivanchuk (USSR) 2. Jeroen Piket (NED) 3. Jacek Gdański (POL)

 --- British Chess Magazine No. 2, Vol. 107 p. 69

See also
 European Individual Chess Championship
 European Senior Chess Championship
 European Youth Chess Championship
 European Team Chess Championship
 World Junior Chess Championship
 World Senior Chess Championship

References
 
 List of winners and complete standings on Italian Chess Federation website: European U20 Chess Championship, European U20 Girls Chess Championship 

Supranational chess championships
Women's chess competitions
1962 in chess
Chess in Europe